The Himalayan striped squirrel (Tamiops mcclellandii), also known as western striped squirrel or Burmese striped squirrel, is a species of rodent in the family Sciuridae. It lives in a variety of forest from tropical to subtropical in Bhutan, Cambodia, China, India, Laos, Malaysia, Myanmar, Nepal, Thailand, and Vietnam. This species is diurnal, arboreal and feeds on fruit, vegetable matter, and insects. It often seen in small groups and uses tree holes for shelter.

The rapid uplift of the Himalayas is believed to have caused the diversification of the three main Tamiops lineages. Multiple divergences from 5.8 to 1.7 mya likely led to the formation of modern Tamiops species.

Gallery

References

Tamiops
Rodents of India
Mammals of Bhutan
Rodents of Cambodia
Rodents of China
Rodents of Laos
Rodents of Malaysia
Rodents of Myanmar
Mammals of Nepal
Rodents of Thailand
Rodents of Vietnam
Mammals described in 1840
Taxonomy articles created by Polbot